Inajá may refer to:

Places
 Inajá, Paraná, municipality in Brazil
 Inajá, Pernambuco, municipality in Brazil
 Inajá River, river in Brazil

Plants
 Attalea maripa